Cranwell's horned frog (Ceratophrys cranwelli), also called commonly the Chacoan horned frog, is a terrestrial frog in the family Ceratophryidae. The species is endemic to the dry Gran Chaco region of Argentina, Bolivia, Paraguay and Brazil. It, like other members of its genus, Ceratophrys, is commonly called the Pac-man frog, because of its resemblance to the video game character of the same name.

Etymology
The specific name, cranwelli, is in honor of Argentinian herpetologist Jorge A. Cranwell.

Description

The back of C. cranwelli usually has dark green and brown coloration, although albino variants with orange and yellow coloration also exist. The dark color scheme aids in camouflaging the animal as it burrows and waits for its prey. Though generally inactive, it is an aggressive eater, and is capable of leaping for several body lengths to capture prey. It uses its sticky tongue to latch onto prey and pull it into its mouth.

Diet and behavior
Cranwell's horned frog is nocturnal and rests with its eyelids open. It is ordinarily carnivorous, feeding mostly on insects and like-sized animals, and is known to cannibalize other frogs. Large individuals have bite forces comparable to those of mammalian predators. Although it is capable of eating animals almost half its size, Cranwell's horned frog sometimes eat things larger than itself. Its bite force is able to immobilize its prey, despite its being half the size of the prey. However, due to a row a teeth along the upper jaw, it is unable to release prey from its mouth causing it to potentially die by choking.

Temperature control
At extremely high temperatures, Cranwell's horned frog enters a period of estivation, developing a thick layer of protective skin to trap moisture and aid in respiration. When estivation is complete, the frog uses its front and hind legs to help shed the protective layer. In many cases, the frog uses its jaws to help pull the skin over its back, often eating the skin in the process.

As pets
Like many Pacman frogs, Cranwell's horned frog is very popular as a pet. As such, it should be kept in a humid environment such as an aquarium with moist substrate (not gravel). It should be fed a mixed diet of gut-loaded crickets, earthworms, small mice, and feeder fish. As a rule of thumb, it should be fed every 1–2 days until the age of 18 months, at which point it should be fed once every 4–7 days.

Because of its large mouth, C. cranwelli is particularly susceptible to impaction, a condition whereby the frog's gastrointestinal tract is obstructed by a foreign body accidentally swallowed. The foreign body can be almost anything, but in Pacman frogs kept as pets, it is commonly a small rock or piece of gravel used as substrate. Impaction often leads to constipation and malnutrition, and possibly death unless treated promptly with laxatives such as the osmotic diuretic lactulose. In severe cases, the volume of feces in the intestines is so large that the lungs are obstructed and the frog's breathing is impaired. Surgery is often the only alternative in these cases, although it is rarely performed because of its typically prohibitive costs.

References

Further reading
Barrio A (1980). "Una nueva especie de Ceratophrys (Anura: Ceratophryidae) del Dominio Chaqueño". Physis, Buenos Aires 39: 21–30. (Ceratophrys cranwelli, new species). (in Spanish).

Ceratophrys
Amphibians of Argentina
Amphibians of Bolivia
Amphibians of Brazil
Amphibians of Paraguay
Amphibians described in 1980